Berny is a given name, usually a short form (hypocorism) of Bernard. It may refer to:

 Bernardina Berny Boxem-Lenferink (born 1948), Dutch retired middle-distance runner
 Berny Burke (born 1996), Costa Rican footballer
 Bernabé Berny Peña (born 1980), Costa Rican footballer
 Bernard Stone (1927–2014), American politician
 Berny Ulloa Morera (born 1950), retired football referee from Costa Rica
 Berny Wiens (born 1945), Canadian politician
 Bernard Wolf (1911–2006), American animator and television producer
 Berny Wright (born 1979), Costa Rican footballer
 Berny-Ignatius, famous music composer-duo-brothers in the Malayalam film industry

See also
 Berny-en-Santerre, commune in the Somme department in Picardie in northern France
 Berny-Rivière, commune in the department of Aisne in Picardy in northern France
 Gare de La Croix de Berny, a station of the Paris RER
 Bernie (disambiguation)

Hypocorisms